Rolf Wüthrich (4 September 1938 – June 2004) was a Swiss footballer.

International career
Wüthrich won 13 caps and 2 goals for the Switzerland national football team. The first cap was 20 May 1961 in Lausanne against Belgium which Switzerland won 2–1. He played his last international match against Albania on 2 May 1965 in Lausanne which Switzerland also won 1–0. Wüthrich also played in the 1962 FIFA World Cup and scored one goal against Chile.

References

1938 births
2004 deaths
Swiss men's footballers
Switzerland international footballers
1962 FIFA World Cup players
Servette FC players
Grasshopper Club Zürich players
1. FC Nürnberg players
BSC Young Boys players
FC Luzern players
FC Zürich players
Swiss-German people
Association football midfielders